Send a Gunboat: The Victorian Navy and Supremacy at Sea, 1854–1904 by Antony Preston and John Major is a naval reference work on small warships of the Victorian Royal Navy, first published in 1967.

The second edition has a foreword by Professor Andrew Lambert which concludes that the contemporary relevance of this book has never been stronger.

References
 

1967 non-fiction books
Books about the Royal Navy
20th-century history books